The 2016–17 Elitedivisionen was the 45th season of the women's football top level league in Denmark. Fortuna Hjørring was the defending champion.

First state
Teams play each other twice. Top six advance to the championship round.

Championship round
Teams play ten more matches. Points from the first stage were apparently not taken over (and then halved like in previous seasons) but bonus points were awarded for the placement. 10 for first place, 8 for second and then 6,4,2 and 0.

Top scorers
.

References

External links
 Official website
 Season on soccerway.com

2016-17
2016–17 domestic women's association football leagues
Women
1